The Journal of Open Hardware is a peer-reviewed open access scientific journal for open-source hardware development. The Journal publishes Hardware Metapapers which describe open-source research hardware, and is the currently the only scientific journal extending its peer review to hardware documentations hosted on external platforms. The Journal also publishes full-length articles on Issues in Open Hardware—including socio-economic and legal issues related to open hardware—and review articles. The journal's encourages papers from across academic, professional, and non-academic communities.

The Journal of Open Hardware has strict guidelines to ensure that hardware complies with the OSHWA definition for open source hardware, allowing hardware to be released under either copyleft licences (such as the CERN OHL or TAPR) or permissive open source licences. The Journal also requires projects to be documented up to a defined standard which is in line with the GOSH quality sharing guidelines.

Abstracting and indexing
The journal is abstracted and indexed in CrossRef and SHERPA/RoMEO.

All metadata can be harvested via OAI-PMH.
As a journal published by Ubiquity Press all data is preserved using CLOCKSS.

References

External links 
 

Publications established in 2017
Ubiquity Press academic journals
English-language journals
Open-source hardware